Orthoporus is a genus of spirostreptid millipedes, containing around 80 species, distributed from the southern United States to Brazil and Argentina.

 Orthoporus absconsus Chamberlin, 1922
 Orthoporus acanthethus Chamberlin, 1947
 Orthoporus ampussis (Karsch, 1881)
 Orthoporus araguayensis Schubart, 1947
 Orthoporus asper (Attems, 1950)
 Orthoporus bidens Schubart, 1945
 Orthoporus bisulcatus Chamberlin, 1952
 Orthoporus bobos Chamberlin, 1952
 Orthoporus boreus Chamberlin, 1947
 Orthoporus brasiliensis Schubart, 1947
 Orthoporus caelatus Loomis, 1936
 Orthoporus canalis (Chamberlin, 1925)
 Orthoporus capucinus (Attems, 1950)
 Orthoporus cayennophilus (Silvestri, 1897)
 Orthoporus chihuanus Chamberlin, 1947
 Orthoporus chiriquensis Pocock, 1909
 Orthoporus cienegonus Chamberlin, 1952
 Orthoporus clavicollis (Karsch, 1881)
 Orthoporus cluniculus (Humbert & Saussure, 1870)
 Orthoporus cobanus Chamberlin, 1922
 Orthoporus comminutus (Attems, 1950)
 Orthoporus conifer (Attems, 1950)
 Orthoporus cordovanus Pocock, 1909
 Orthoporus diaporoides Silvestri, 1897
 Orthoporus discriminans Chamberlin, 1922
 Orthoporus dybasi (Chamberlin, 1952)
 Orthoporus esperanzae Chamberlin, 1943
 Orthoporus etholax Chamberlin, 1923
 Orthoporus euthus Chamberlin, 1952
 Orthoporus extensus Loomis, 1966
 Orthoporus festae (Silvestri, 1896)
 Orthoporus flavior Chamberlin & Mulaik, 1941
 Orthoporus foliatus Chamberlin, 1923
 Orthoporus fraternus (Saussure, 1860)
 Orthoporus gaigei Chamberlin, 1923
 Orthoporus gracilior Chamberlin, 1952
 Orthoporus guerreronus (Chamberlin, 1942)
 Orthoporus haitiensis Chamberlin, 1918
 Orthoporus heterogona Silvestri, 1902
 Orthoporus hoctunicolens Chamberlin, 1938
 Orthoporus kiemi Loomis, 1962
 Orthoporus leius Chamberlin, 1943
 Orthoporus leonicus Chamberlin, 1941
 Orthoporus lomonti Brölemann, 1932
 Orthoporus luchilicolens Chamberlin, 1938
 Orthoporus margarites (Chamberlin, 1946)
 Orthoporus mimus Chamberlin, 1943
 Orthoporus montezumae (Saussure, 1859)
 Orthoporus mundus Chamberlin, 1942
 Orthoporus nesiotes Chamberlin, 1923
 Orthoporus nodosus Loomis, 1974
 Orthoporus omalopage (Brölemann, 1905)
 Orthoporus ornatus (Girard, 1853)
 Orthoporus palmensis (Brölemann, 1905)
 Orthoporus paxillicauda Loomis, 1962
 Orthoporus poculifer Silvestri, 1897
 Orthoporus punctatissimus Silvestri, 1897
 Orthoporus reimoseri (Attems, 1950)
 Orthoporus rodriguezi (Brölemann, 1900)
 Orthoporus rugiceps (Attems, 1950)
 Orthoporus salvadoricus (Kraus, 1954)
 Orthoporus sanctus Chamberlin, 1947
 Orthoporus sculpturatus (Karsch, 1881)
 Orthoporus solicolens Chamberlin, 1938
 Orthoporus striatulus Pocock, 1909
 Orthoporus tabulinus Attems, 1914
 Orthoporus teapensis Pocock, 1909
 Orthoporus tehuacanus Chamberlin, 1952
 Orthoporus texicolens Chamberlin, 1938
 Orthoporus tizamensis Chamberlin, 1938
 Orthoporus torreonus Chamberlin, 1943
 Orthoporus triquetrus Loomis, 1936
 Orthoporus trisulcatus (Daday, 1889)
 Orthoporus vialis Loomis, 1974
 Orthoporus walkeri Chamberlin, 1923
 Orthoporus zizicolens (Chamberlin, 1938)

References

Spirostreptida
Millipedes of North America
Millipedes of South America
Taxa named by Filippo Silvestri